Eupatolitin is a chemical compound. It is an O-methylated flavonol, a type of flavonoid. Eupatolitin can be found in Brickellia veronicaefolia and in Ipomopsis aggregata.

Glycoside 
Eupatolin is a eupatolitin glycoside containing a rhamnose attached at the 3 position. It can be found in Eupatorium ligustrinum.

References

External links 
 Eupatolotin on www.genome.jp

O-methylated flavonols
Flavonoids found in Asteraceae
Catechols